Nowthen is a city in Anoka County, Minnesota, United States.  The population was 4,536 at the 2020 census.

Geography
Nowthen is located in the northwestern section of Anoka County.

Minnesota State Highway 47 and County Road 22 are two of the main routes in the community.

Nearby places include St. Francis, Oak Grove, Andover, Ramsey, and Elk River.  Nowthen is located 12 miles north-northwest of the city of Anoka.

History
In 1869, Burns Township broke off from St. Francis Township.

The city was formerly known as Burns Township until June 30, 2008, when it was incorporated as the city of Nowthen.  The drive toward incorporation started at the township's annual meeting in March 2007, when residents decided to incorporate in order to prevent annexation by other nearby cities.  The name originated from an unincorporated community named Nowthen near the intersection of County Roads 5 and 22 within the former township.  "Nowthen" was coined by the town's first postmaster, James Hare, who had the habit of saying "Now, then" in conversation.

Demographics

2010 census
As of the census of 2010, there were 4,443 people, 1,450 households, and 1,227 families residing in the city. The racial makeup of the city was 96.2% White, 0.9% African American, 0.5% Native American, 1.3% Asian, 0.1% from other races, and 0.9% from two or more races. Hispanic or Latino of any race were 1.0% of the population.

There were 1,450 households, of which 42.3% had children under the age of 18 living with them, 74.6% were married couples living together, 5.3% had a female householder with no husband present, 4.7% had a male householder with no wife present, and 15.4% were non-families. 11.4% of all households were made up of individuals, and 3% had someone living alone who was 65 years of age or older. The average household size was 3.04 and the average family size was 3.27.

The median age in the city was 39.9 years. 28.3% of residents were under the age of 18; 8.5% were between the ages of 18 and 24; 23.2% were from 25 to 44; 33% were from 45 to 64; and 7% were 65 years of age or older. The gender makeup of the city was 52.1% male and 47.9% female.

2000 census
As of the census of 2000, there were 3,557 people, 1,123 households, and 985 families residing in the township. The racial makeup of the township was 98.54% White, 0.20% African American, 0.28% Native American, 0.17% Asian, 0.14% from other races, and 0.67% from two or more races. Hispanic or Latino of any race were 0.59% of the population.

There were 1,123 households, out of which 47.4% had children under the age of 18 living with them, 80.3% were married couples living together, 3.9% had a female householder with no husband present, and 12.2% were non-families. 8.4% of all households were made up of individuals, and 2.0% had someone living alone who was 65 years of age or older.  The average household size was 3.16 and the average family size was 3.36.

In the township the population was spread out, with 32.7% under the age of 18, 5.8% from 18 to 24, 34.5% from 25 to 44, 21.9% from 45 to 64, and 5.0% who were 65 years of age or older.  The median age was 34 years. For every 100 females, there were 109.9 males.  For every 100 females age 18 and over, there were 106.8 males.

The median income for a household in the township was $63,819, and the median income for a family was $65,843. Males had a median income of $42,374 versus $31,454 for females. The per capita income for the township was $21,569.  About 4.1% of families and 4.6% of the population were below the poverty line, including 6.0% of those under age 18 and none of those age 65 or over.

Law enforcement
Historically the community did not have its own law enforcement agency and instead relied on the Anoka County Sheriff's Office. In 2011, the Sheriff’s Office asked the city to pay for non-emergency law enforcement services. The city council voted 3–2 to not do this, which led to the city only having emergency law enforcement as it chose not to establish its own police force. The department's request would have meant a 27% increase in property taxes.

First responders
Nowthen built their first fire department in 2021. Ramsey wanted to charge Nowthen about $160,000 in administrative costs, the mayor thought that was to high. Nowthen will take a fire engine, tanker, rescue rig, hoses and other equipment from Ramsey and they also gain a fire station that they can now use. They will pay the city of St. Francis about $75,000 a year for the next three years to have the assistance chief, Dave Schmidt, oversee the startup and head the department.

They currently have 12 members working for the Fire Department, and are expecting eight more to join.

Culture

Parks
The city of Nowthen has two parks, Nowthen Memorial Park and Twin Lakes City Park.

Nowthen Memorial Park includes baseball, softball and soccer fields, as well as a volleyball and a basketball court.  Horse shoes, a playground, picnic area, and a walking path are also at the park.

Twin Lakes City Park includes a beach, a fishing pier, a boat dock and a sand volleyball court.  The park also has a playground, many walking paths and picnic shelters which all contain at least one grill.  A new disc golf course is also available.

Churches
Nowthen Alliance Church is the largest church within Nowthen and is a part of the Christian and Missionary Alliance denomination.  It is located at the intersection of Nowthen Boulevard and Viking Boulevard.

Nowthen Threshing Show
The Nowthen Threshing Show has been an annual event for over 40 years.  It is a three-day event that takes place during the third full weekend in August.  There are many attractions including tractor pulls, music, sawmill demonstrations and more.  Guests can see blacksmithing, corn chopping and walking through old restored buildings including a town church, general store, train depot, log cabin and log barn, and an old one-room school house.  There are many antique machines and tractors guests can walk around and look at.  The theme of the Nowthen Threshing Show is “Bringing the Past to the Present.”

References

External links
 Nowthen City Website

Cities in Anoka County, Minnesota
Cities in Minnesota
Populated places established in 2008
2008 establishments in Minnesota
Defunct townships in Minnesota